Dneprovka is a rural locality (a settlement) and the administrative center of Mokhonovskoye Rural Settlement, Starodubsky District, Bryansk Oblast, Russia. The population was 18 as of 2010. There are 6 streets.

Geography 
Dneprovka is located 9 km north of Starodub (the district's administrative centre) by road. Pyatovsk is the nearest rural locality.

References 

Rural localities in Starodubsky District